Atmospheric circulation of a planet is largely specific to the planet in question and the study of atmospheric circulation of exoplanets is a nascent field as direct observations of exoplanet atmospheres are still quite sparse. However, by considering the fundamental principles of fluid dynamics and imposing various limiting assumptions, a theoretical understanding of atmospheric motions can be developed. This theoretical framework can also be applied to planets within the Solar System and compared against direct observations of these planets, which have been studied more extensively than exoplanets, to validate the theory and understand its limitations as well.

The theoretical framework first considers the Navier–Stokes equations, the governing equations of fluid motion. Then, limiting assumptions are imposed to produce simplified models of fluid motion specific to large scale motion atmospheric dynamics. These equations can then be studied for various conditions (i.e. fast vs. slow planetary rotation rate, stably stratified vs. unstably stratified atmosphere) to see how a planet's characteristics would impact its atmospheric circulation. For example, a planet may fall into one of two regimes based on its rotation rate: geostrophic balance or cyclostrophic balance.

Atmospheric motions

Coriolis force 

When considering atmospheric circulation we tend to take the planetary body as the frame of reference. In fact, this is a non-inertial frame of reference which has acceleration due to the planet's rotation about its axis. Coriolis force is the force that acts on objects moving within the planetary frame of reference, as a result of the planet's rotation. Mathematically, the acceleration due to Coriolis force can be written as:

where

   is the flow velocity
  is the planet's angular velocity vector

This force acts perpendicular to the flow and velocity and the planet's angular velocity vector, and comes into play when considering the atmospheric motion of a rotating planet.

Mathematical models

Navier-Stokes momentum equation 
Conservation of momentum for a flow is given by the following equation:

where

  is the material derivative
  is the pressure
  is the density
  is the gravitational acceleration
  is the vector from the rotation axis
  is the force of friction
The term  is the centripetal acceleration due to the rotation of the planet.

Simplified model for large-scale motion 
The above equation can be simplified to a form suitable for large-scale atmospheric motion. First, the velocity vector  is split into the three components of wind:

where

  is the zonal wind
  is the meridional wind
  is the vertical wind

Next, we ignore friction and vertical wind. Thus, the equations for zonal and meridional wind simplify to:

and the equation in the vertical direction simplifies to the hydrostatic equilibrium equation:

where the parameter  has absorbed the vertical component of the centripetal force. In the above equations:

Key drivers of circulation

Thermodynamics 
Temperature gradients are one of the drivers of circulation, as one effect of atmospheric flow is to transport heat from places of high temperature to those of low temperature in an effort to reach thermal equilibrium. Generally, planets have stably stratified atmospheres. This means that motion due to temperature gradient in the vertical direction is opposed by the pressure gradient in the vertical direction. In this case, it is the horizontal temperature gradients (on constant pressure surfaces) which drive circulation. Such temperature gradients are typically maintained by uneven heating/cooling throughout a planet's atmosphere. On Earth, for example, at the equator, the atmosphere absorbs more net energy from the Sun that it does at the poles.

Planetary rotation 
As noted previously, planetary rotation is important when it comes to atmospheric circulation as Coriolis and centripetal forces arise as a results of planetary rotation. When considering a steady version of the simplified equations for large-scale motion presented above, both Coriolis and centripetal forces work to balance out the horizontal pressure gradients. Depending on the rotation rate of the planet, one of these forces will dominate and affect the atmospheric circulation accordingly.

Geostrophic balance 
For a planet with rapid rotation, the Coriolis force is the dominant force which balances pressure gradient. In this case the equations for large-scale motion further simplify to:

where the  subscript denotes a constant altitude surface and the  subscript denotes geostrophic wind. Note that in this case, the geostrophic wind is perpendicular to pressure gradient. This is due to the fact that Coriolis force acts perpendicularly to the direction of wind. Therefore, since pressure gradient induces a wind parallel to the gradient, the Coriolis force will act perpendicularly to the pressure gradient. As Coriolis force dominates in this regime, the resulting winds are perpendicular to pressure gradient.

Cyclostrophic balance 
For a planet with a low rotation rate and negligible Coriolis force, pressure gradient may instead be balanced by centripetal acceleration. In this case the equations for large-scale motion further simplify to:

for a prevailing wind in the east-west direction.

See Also
 Exometeorology
 Extraterrestrial atmospheres

References 

Wikipedia Student Program
Exoplanetology